Gerhard Weber may refer to:
 Gerhard Weber (architect)
 Gerhard Weber (designer)